The 2011–12 College Hockey America women's ice hockey season marked the continuation of the annual tradition of competitive ice hockey among College Hockey America members.

Offseason
May 27: CHA member Wayne State University announced that sponsorship of the women's ice hockey program had been dissolved. The decision was attributed due to continuing reductions in the state of Michigan appropriations for higher education. The Wayne State Warriors recorded an all-time CHA mark of 48-59-7 (.452) in nine seasons, tying for the CHA regular-season title in 2007–08.
June 13: Mercyhurst Lakers assistant coach Paul Colontino left the club to become head coach of the Robert Morris Colonials. He is the third head coach in Colonials history, after the resignation of Nate Handrahan, who left to assume the head coaching position at Ohio State.
September  6: Robert DeGregorio, Commissioner for College Hockey America (CHA), announced that the Penn State Nittany Lions had been accepted into the CHA. The Nittany Lions will officially join the conference starting with the 2012–13 season.

Wayne State transfers

Exhibition

CIS

September 17, 2011: Senior Bailey Bram registered a hat trick to go with her three assists, as the Lakers trounced the Wilfried Laurier Golden Hawks by a 10-2 tally. Her sister, Shelby Bram scored one goal while freshman Kristine Grenier also registered a hat trick in the match. Kelley Steadman contributed with four assists.

PWHL

September 24, 2011: Sophomore Christine Bestland notched five points as the Lakers defeated the Stoney Creek Jr. Sabres of the PWHL by a 6-0 score. The Lakers scored four goals within a five and a half minute time span late in the second period.
September 25, 2011: Freshman Caroline Luczak notched a goal, while registering three assists as the Lakers defeated the Toronto Jr. Aeros of the PWHL.

Regular season

News and notes

September
September 14: The Lindenwood Lady Lions ice hockey program officially submitted an application to join College Hockey America (CHA) for the 2012–2013 season.
In the Mercyhurst Lakers season opener on September 30, 2011, Bestland was named the game's First Star in a 4-0 shutout over the nationally ranked Quinnipiac Bobcats. Bailey Bram scored the game-winning goal (it was the 61st goal of her career). Goaltender Hillary Pattenden earned her 13th career shutout (and 81st career win) while Bailey Bram scored the game-winning goal.

October
October 1, 2011: Bailey Bram played in her 100th career game for the Mercyhurst Lakers. Bram would be held pointless as the Lakers would lose the game by a 1-0 tally to the Quinnipiac Bobcats. It was Quinnipiac's first victory over Mercyhurst in twelve regular season matches.
October 7–8: Robert Morris freshman Katie Fergus accumulated three points in her NCAA debut with one goal and two assists. Against the Lindenwood Lions, she got her first-collegiate point fewer than nine minutes into the opening period. Later in the game, she scored her first goal as the Colonials were on the penalty kill. In the second game versus Lindenwood, she earned her first multi-goal game. Fergus became one of just two freshmen in Colonials history to register multi-point performances in the first two games of a season. Fergus finished the series versus Lindenwood by scoring three goals and two assists five points. In addition, she had eight shots to complement a +5 plus/minus.
October 8, 2011: Brianna Delaney registered the sixth three-point game of her career at Robert Morris. With the achievement, she tied the Colonials all-time record for career points. The 24th-career multi-point game of her career increased her point total to 97. The total now equals the record that Sara O'Malley set during the 2010-11 campaign.
 October 27–28: The series versus the Lindenwood Lady Lions ice hockey program marked the first time that Lindenwood hosted an NCAA Division I opponent in their home arena. Mercyhurst would win the October 28 match by a 7-0 tally, in which Lakers freshman Shelby Bram would score her first career NCAA goal. The October 29 contest saw Mercyhurst emerge as the victor in a 14-0 wash. Kelley Steadman would score four goals and notch an assist, while Jess Jones would earn a hat trick. The Bram sisters (Shelby and Bailey) each earned two goals.

December
December 9: In a 4-2 loss to the Boston College Eagles on December 9, 2011, Kelley Steadman scored her 100th career point. The point was a goal in the second period on Boston College goalkeeper Corrine Boyles.
December 10: In a 3-2 overtime victory versus Boston College, Hillary Pattenden made a career high 48 saves to earn the 91st victory of her NCAA career, tying former Wisconsin goaltender Jessie Vetter for the NCAA Division I record. Jill Szandzik scored at 3:01 into overtime for her second goal of the season. Bailey Bram had three assists, including one on the game-winner to give her 40 points in 16 games. Christine Bestland also earned three points. Pattenden's 48 saves broke her previous high of 38 (made earlier in the 2011-12 season) at Minnesota State-Mankato.
December 14: In a 9-0 defeat of the Lindenwood Lady Lions, Hillary Pattenden broke Jessie Vetter's record for career NCAA wins, by notching her 92nd career victory. Forward Bailey Bram scored two goals and added four assists while Kelley Steadman scored the game-winning goal.

January
On Friday, January 20, 2012, Brianna Delaney scored in the third period of a 4-2 loss to CHA rival Mercyhurst. After being hooked, she scored on a wrist shot top shelf as she was falling to the ice. With the score, Delaney reached several milestones; she became just the second Robert Morris player to reach the 50 goal plateau, as her 20th point of the season it made her the first player in school history to post four 20 point seasons, and it also marked the 113th point of her career, the most by any Robert Morris women's hockey player in school history.
January 31: Rebecca Vint logged an assist in the third period at Princeton to tie the Colonials' single-season points mark.

February
February 3–4: In a sweep over CHA opponent Syracuse, Rebecca Vint led all Colonials skaters in points. In the first game, she scored the game-winning goal to break the Colonials' single-season record for points in one season. In the 4-3 win versus the Orange, it was Vint's fourth game-winning goal of the season (a Colonials record). The following day, Vint tied the Colonials' single-season mark for goals in a 5-2 triumph. In addition, she assisted on the game-winning goal to notch her 10th multi-point effort of the season.
February 10: Rebecca Vint notched her fifth game-winning goal of the season, a new Colonials record. In addition, said goal also broke the school record for overall goals in a season. In the third period, she logged another goal to register her sixth multi-goal game of the campaign. The following day, Vint assisting on both RMU goals to break the single-season assist record. With the two assists, she also became the first Colonial to notch 40 points in a season. Her five game-winning goals leads all skaters in the CHA.
February 18: In a contest versus the Robert Morris Colonials, Hillary Pattenden competed in the final regular season game of her NCAA career. Heading into the game, she had 99 career regular season victories, and was aiming to be the first NCAA women's goaltender with 100 career wins. With a 4-3 Mercyhurst lead late in the third period, Colonials skater Dayna Newsom recorded a game-tying goal, as both teams skated to a 4-4 final score.

Standings

In-season honors

CHA Weekly Honors

Source:

Monthly awards

Postseason

2012 CHA Women's Ice Hockey Tournament

2012 CHA All-Tournament Team

Tournament MVP: Kristen DiCiocco, G, Robert Morris
 Kathryn Stack, D, Robert Morris
 Pamela Zgoda, D, Mercyhurst
 Christine Bestland, F, Mercyhurst
 Shiann Darkangelo, F, Syracuse
 Brianna Delaney, F, Robert Morris

Seasonal awards 

 Player of the Year: Kelley Steadman, F, Sr., Mercyhurst
 Rookie of the Year: Rebecca Vint, F, Fr., Robert Morris
 Scoring Champion: Kelley Steadman, F, Sr., Mercyhurst (15-8-23)
 Goaltending Champion: Kristen DiCiocco, G, Jr., Robert Morris
 Coach of the Year:  Paul Colontino, Robert Morris

Source:

CHA All-Conference First Team

 Bailey Bram, F, Sr., Mercyhurst
 Kelly Steadman, F, Sr., Mercyhurst
 Christine Bestland, F, So., Mercyhurst
 Rebecca Vint, F, Fr., Robert Morris
 Jill Szandzik, D, Sr., Mercyhurst
 Molly Bryne, D, Fr., Mercyhurst
 Erica Owczarczak, D, Sr., Niagara
 Kirsten DiCiocco, G, Jr., Robert Morris

CHA All-Conference Second Team

 Jess Jones, F, Sr., Mercyhurst
 Thea Imbrogno, F, So., Robert Morris
 Margot Scharfe, F, So., Syracuse
 Kelsey Gunn, D, Fr., Niagara
 Caitlin Roach, D, So., Syracuse
 Sarah Moses, G, So., Niagara

CHA All-Rookie Team

 Rebecca Vint, F, Fr., Robert Morris
 Nicole Ferrara, F, Fr., Syracuse
 Kayla Raniwsky, F, Fr., Niagara
 Molly Bryne, D, Fr., Mercyhurst
 Kaillie Goodnough, D, Fr., Syracuse
 Abby Ryplanskii, G, Fr. Niagara

Source:

See also
 National Collegiate Women's Ice Hockey Championship
 2010–11 CHA women's ice hockey season
 2011–12 WCHA women's ice hockey season
 2011–12 ECAC women's ice hockey season
 2011–12 Hockey East women's ice hockey season

References

CHA
College Hockey America